Danièle Sauvageau,  (born April 22, 1962)  is a Canadian ice hockey executive and former coach, and former police officer. Sauvageau was the head coach of the Canadian national women's hockey team that won the gold medal in ice hockey at the 2002 Winter Olympics.

Early life
Originally from Deux-Montagnes, Quebec, Sauvageau was a member of the Royal Canadian Mounted Police and the Service de police de la Ville de Montréal for 33 years, serving 10 years in the narcotics division. As a Police Sergeant, she has also performed undercover narcotics investigations, busted a squad car full of drug dealers, and even ordered a forced entry and rescue of a double agent whose life was in jeopardy. She spend more a decade serving strategic division. President and chief executive officer of the "Montreal Police and Fire Games 2017"

Hockey
Sauvageau was the head coach for the Ferland Quatre Glaces (first based out of Brossard, and then Repentigny) team in the League Régionale du Hockey au Féminin in the province of Québec. When the Canadian Under-19 women's hockey team was founded on May 15, 1996, Danielle Sauvageau was the head coach. Two future Olympians played for her: Caroline Ouellette and speed skater Cindy Klassen. Sauvageau was named head coach of Canada's National Women's Hockey Team for the 2001 World Hockey Championship and the 2002 Winter Olympics on June 22, 2000. As head coach of the first Canadian Olympic hockey team to win gold in 50 years, Sauvageau became a Canadian hero.

Sauvageau has worked at almost every level of hockey open to female coaches. After the disappointing silver medal showing at the 1998 Winter Olympics in Nagano, Sauvageau was named the new head coach of the team and general manager of the Canadian female hockey program. Following eight straight losses to the U.S. team prior to the Olympics, her team-building methods and leadership skills led the team to a gold medal in 2002.

In 1999–2000, she became an assistant coach for the Montreal Rocket of the QMJHL. She was the first female coach in QMJHL history. Sauvageau was the first female NHL Saturday Night Hockey TV analyst for Canada's French station Télévision de Radio-Canada and is the new official spokesperson for the Coaching Association of Canada. She was a member of the successful bid committee for the Vancouver 2010 Olympic bid.

As part of the IIHF Ambassador and Mentor Program, Sauvageau was a Hockey Canada coaching mentor that travelled to Bratislava, Slovakia to participate in the 2011 IIHF High Performance Women's Camp from July 4 to 12.

As of 2010, she was the general manager of the Montreal Carabins women's ice hockey program. In 2021, she also served as general manager and coach of the Montreal team in the Professional Women's Hockey Players Association.

Education
She is a graduate of the Université de Montréal and of the RCMP Academy, Depot Division. She was a sergeant in the Service de police de la Ville de Montréal (City of Montreal Police Service).

Awards and honours
Sauvageau received an Honorary Doctorate of Civil Law (DCL) from Saint Mary's University (Halifax. N.S.) in October 2002 for her leadership in international athletics
In 2004, she was awarded the Meritorious Service Cross (civil division). 
In 2008, Sauvageau was inducted into the Canadian Olympic Hall of Fame.
She was made an Officer of the Order of Canada (OC) as per Canada Gazette of 6 July 2013.
2021 Hockey Canada Female Breakthrough Award

References

External links
 Official website

Living people
1962 births
Canadian ice hockey coaches
Canadian women police officers
French Quebecers
Montreal Rocket coaches
People from Laurentides
Royal Canadian Mounted Police officers
Recipients of the Meritorious Service Decoration
Université de Montréal alumni
Officers of the Order of Canada